R. K. Nayyar (born Ram Krishna Nayyar, died 1995) was an Indian film director, producer and screenwriter in Hindi language films.

Professional life 
His major directorial work includes Love in Simla which released in 1960.

In India, Love in Simla was the fifth highest-grossing film of 1960. It grossed 1.7 crore in 1960.

In the Soviet Union, the film was released in 1963 and came third place on the year's Soviet box office chart. The film drew a Soviet box office audience of 35 million viewers, making it one of the top 20 most successful Indian films in the Soviet Union.

Personal life
R.K. Nayyar married Indian actress Sadhana, first cousin of actress Babita. in 1966.

Filmography

As director

As producer

As screenwriter

References

External links
 

Film producers from Mumbai
Hindi film producers
Hindi-language film directors
Film directors from Mumbai
Indian Hindus
20th-century Indian film directors
Indian male screenwriters
Screenwriters from Mumbai
Hindi screenwriters